The Melbert Rocks are rock outcrops close north-west of Mount Paterson in the Rockefeller Mountains of Edward VII Peninsula, Antarctica. They were discovered by the Byrd Antarctic Expedition, 1928–30, and were named by the Advisory Committee on Antarctic Names for George W. Melbert, U.S. Navy, a utilitiesman at Byrd Station, 1966.

References

External links

Rock formations of the Ross Dependency
King Edward VII Land